The 1957 California Golden Bears baseball team represented the University of California in the 1957 NCAA University Division baseball season. The Golden Bears played their home games at Evans Diamond. The team was coached by George Wolfman in his 3rd season at California.

The Golden Bears won the College World Series, defeating the Penn State Nittany Lions in the championship game.

Roster

Schedule 

! style="background:#ffcc33;color:#010066;"| Post-Season
|-

|- align="center" bgcolor="#ddffdd"
| vs.  || 4-2 || 29-9
|- align="center" bgcolor="#ffdddd"
| vs. Pepperdine || 6-10 || 29-10
|- align="center" bgcolor="#ddffdd"
| vs. Pepperdine || 10-3 || 30-10
|-

|- align="center" bgcolor="ddffdd"
| June 8 || vs.  || Rosenblatt Stadium || 4-0 || 31-10
|- align="center" bgcolor="ddffdd"
| June 9 || vs. Iowa State || Rosenblatt Stadium || 8-2 || 32-10
|- align="center" bgcolor="ddffdd"
| June 10 || vs. Penn State || Rosenblatt Stadium || 8-0 || 33-10
|- align="center" bgcolor="ddffdd"
| June 11 || vs. Iowa State || Rosenblatt Stadium || 9-1 || 34-10
|- align="center" bgcolor="ddffdd"
| June 12 || vs. Penn State || Rosenblatt Stadium || 1-0 || 35-10
|-

Awards and honors 
Earl Robinson
 All-America First Team
 All-District 8 First Team

Charles Thompson
 All-America First Team
 All-District 8 First Team

Doug Weiss
 All-America First Team
 All-District 8 First Team

References 

California
California Golden Bears baseball seasons
College World Series seasons
NCAA Division I Baseball Championship seasons
Pac-12 Conference baseball champion seasons
Golden Bear